Abbas Khan may refer to:
 Abbas Khan, Lorestan, a village in Kashkan Rural District, Lorestan Province, Iran
 Abbas Khan (cricketer) (1911–2002), Indian cricketer
 Abbas Khan (squash player) (1954–2021), Pakistani squash player
 Abbas Khan (died 2013), British orthopaedic surgeon killed while imprisoned by the Syrian government, see Death of Abbas Khan